The Renault RE40 is a Formula One racing car. It was designed by Michel Tétu — under the direction of Bernard Dudot, and with aerodynamics by Jean-Claude Migeot — as Renault's car for the 1983 Formula One season.

Design
Ground effect had been banned at the end of 1982, and so the car was built around a flat-bottomed arrangement. It featured enlarged wings to try to claw back as much of the lost downforce as possible. It was also the first Formula One car to feature exhaust routing such that it increased the downforce created by the diffuser. René Arnoux had left the team to be replaced by Eddie Cheever, whilst Alain Prost was now undisputed no.1 driver. The RE40 was designed around his driving style, and he racked up many miles of testing to avoid the unreliability of the previous two seasons.

The RE40 was the first Renault chassis to be built entirely of carbon fibre. Construction of the chassis was outsourced to carbon fibre-specialists Hurel-Dubois, who had experience of the material through their aerospace background.  The only part of the chassis not to be constructed in the new material was a small, aluminium nose section, known as the "crash box", that facilitated easy repair in the case of a minor accident. As Formula One use of carbon fibre was only a recent development, and following Didier Pironi's career-ending accident the previous year, the chassis was overbuilt to ensure strength.

Within the novel chassis sat Renault's, by now venerable, Renault Gordini EF1 turbocharged 1.5-litre V6 engine. Over the years the engine had been uprated and subtly redesigned, and the twin-turbo (one per cylinder bank) evolution within the RE40 produced a claimed . However, the turbochargers themselves were to prove the RE40's weakness in 1983, and on numerous occasions turbo troubles ended Prost or Cheever's race. Alain Prost later recalled that "that year there was a good turbo to have and a bad one. We had the bad one".

Competition history

Prost scored consistently and took four wins during the season. He led the drivers' championship for most of the season, ahead of Arnoux who was now at Ferrari alongside another championship contender Patrick Tambay, and  World Champion Nelson Piquet in the Brabham-BMW, but at the final round in South Africa the turbo in Prost's car failed and Piquet won the title by two points.

The RE40 was best suited to the faster tracks such as Spa, Silverstone, the Österreichring and Monza (of the four, Prost would only fail to win Monza where he recorded a DNF), but Prost made the best of his car and team and won more races than any other driver during the year. Cheever, who accepted being the number 2 driver behind Prost, proved to be a good team mate; unlike with Arnoux, Prost and Cheever got on well and the atmosphere within the team was generally good. Cheever scored several podiums and was in line for victory on more than one occasion, but for more reliability he might have broken his duck.

Prost was tired of Renault's inability to put together a consistent challenge for either championship and was sacked at season's end after publicly criticising the team for their lack of development on the RE40. He would join McLaren at the end of the year. The RE40 took four wins and three poles during the season. However, Prost enjoyed driving the RE40 and later commented that it was "a lovely car ... we should have been World Champions 10 times over." Cheever was also gone at the end of a frustrating season and would join Alfa Romeo.

Alain Prost's win at the Austrian Grand Prix would prove to be the French team's last win in their original run in Formula One, with the team failing to win a Grand Prix in either  or  before Renault pulled out of Grand Prix racing as a constructor at the end of 1985.

The RE40 was replaced by the first round of 1984 by the RE50.

Complete Formula One World Championship results
(key) (note: results shown in bold indicate pole position; results in italics indicate fastest lap)

References

Sources 

Dro, P. 2007. Close quarters. Motor Sport, 83/12 (December 2007), 86-90

 (French)

Footnotes

External links 

 Lapping the old Zandvoort circuit in a Renault RE40, driven by Alain Prost. (Video)

RE40
1983 Formula One season cars